Frank Samuel "Lefty" Barnes (January 9, 1900 – September 27, 1967) was a Major League Baseball (MLB) pitcher. Barnes played for the Detroit Tigers in 1929 and the New York Yankees in 1930. In six career games, he had a 0–2 record, with a 7.79 earned run average.

External links

1900 births
1967 deaths
Detroit Tigers players
New York Yankees players
Major League Baseball pitchers
Baseball players from Dallas